The  was an electric multiple unit (EMU) train type operated by the private railway operator Nagoya Railroad (Meitetsu) in Japan from December 2008 until 2021.

Formation
The fleet consisted of four 6-car sets, formed as follows.

Cars 1, 4, and 6 each had a single-arm pantograph.

Interior

History
The six-car trainsets were formed in 2008 by combining two cars from former 1600 series limited express EMUs with four newly built 2300 series commuter cars. The trains entered service from the start of the revised timetable on 27 December 2008.

The fleet was reliveried from August 2015, starting with set 1701.

Withdrawal 

Withdrawals of the 1700 series commenced in 2019. The four sets of 2300 series cars were used to form four 2200 series six-car sets. These sets, numbered 2231 to 2234, use two newly built limited express cars and four 2300 series cars originally used with the 1700 series sets. The first of these sets to be formed, 2234, entered service in February 2020, using the 2300 series cars from 1700 series set 1704.

All 1700 series limited express cars were scrapped by February 2021.

References

External links

 1700 series information on Meitetsu website 
 1700 series information on Nippon Sharyo website 
  (Japan Railfan Magazine) 

Electric multiple units of Japan
1700 series
Train-related introductions in 2008

ja:名鉄2200系電車#1700系
Nippon Sharyo multiple units
1500 V DC multiple units of Japan